Sword is a Canadian heavy metal band from Saint-Bruno-de-Montarville, Quebec, that was formed in 1981 and is still active to this day. To date, they have released three studio albums, one compilation, one live album and three singles.

History
In 1981, south of Montreal in Saint Bruno de Montarville, Quebec, Rick (vocals) and Dan Hughes (drums) formed a heavy metal band called Sword. They were joined by guitarist Mike Plant and bassist Mike Larocque in the first lineup of the band.  They signed their first commercial contract in 1984 with Aquarius Records.

Sword released two albums for Aquarius in the late 1980s; the debut album Metalized in 1986 and its follow-up Sweet Dreams in 1988.

They toured in the support slot for Motörhead and Alice Cooper, and the group opened for Metallica on their Master of Puppets tour in 1986.

Rick Hughes also formed Saints & Sinners and released a self-titled album with them.

In October 2006, Aquarius Records released The Best of Sword a compilation album. Metalized was re-issued in 2009.

Throughout their career, Sword sold in excess of 180,000 albums.

Sword has been more active since 2011 when they reunited for a show in Saguenay.

They have since played various festivals in Canada and Germany. In 2016, they released Live Hammersmith, recorded while they were on tour supporting Motörhead in 1987.

Sword's third studio album (their first in 34 years) titled III was released on November 25, 2022.

Discography

Studio albums
Metalized (1986)
Sweet Dreams (1988)
III (2022)

Live albums
Live Hammersmith (2016)

Compilation albums
The Best of Sword (2006)

Related information
In 2006, Rick Hughes released a solo album called Train d'enfer. Mike Plant plays guitar for the band Porn Flakes.

References

External links
Rick Hughes website
Roadrunner Records

Canadian heavy metal musical groups
Musical groups from Quebec
Saint-Bruno-de-Montarville
Musical groups established in 1981
1981 establishments in Quebec